Dennis A. Cornell (born 1948) is an Associate Justice of the California Fifth District Court of Appeal, having been appointed to the post by Governor Gray Davis in 2000.

Born in Merced, California, Cornell received an A.B. from Stanford University in 1969 and a J.D. from George Washington University Law School in 1972.  From 1972–1992, he was an attorney in Merced.  From 1986–1992, Cornell was a part-time U.S. Magistrate Judge for the U.S. District Court for the Eastern District of California.  In 1992, Governor Pete Wilson appointed him to the Merced County Superior Court.  In 2000, Governor Gray Davis appointed Cornell as an associate justice of the California Fifth District Court of Appeal.

References

External links
Official biography of Dennis A. Cornell
Dennis Cornell profile on Judgepedia

1948 births
Living people
People from Merced, California
Lawyers from Los Angeles
Stanford University alumni
George Washington University Law School alumni
Judges of the California Courts of Appeal